Yoann Touzghar (born 28 November 1986) is a professional footballer who plays as a forward for  club Ajaccio. Born in France, he represents Tunisia at international level.

Club career
In the 2015–16 season Touzghar played for Club Africain scoring once in six matches.

On 5 July 2016, Touzghar joined Auxerre on a two-year contract plus an option amid reported interest from Reims and Gazélec Ajaccio.

On 24 August 2022, Touzghar signed a two-year contract with Ajaccio.

International goals
Scores and results list Tunisia's goal tally first, score column indicates score after each Touzghar goal.

References

External links
 
 Player Profile at SO Foot

1986 births
Living people
Sportspeople from Avignon
Association football forwards
Tunisian footballers
Tunisia international footballers
French footballers
Amiens SC players
RC Lens players
Club Africain players
AJ Auxerre players
FC Sochaux-Montbéliard players
ES Troyes AC players
AC Ajaccio players
Ligue 1 players
Ligue 2 players
Championnat National players
Tunisian Ligue Professionnelle 1 players
French sportspeople of Tunisian descent
French sportspeople of Moroccan descent
Tunisian people of Moroccan descent
2021 Africa Cup of Nations players